Pak Telecommunication Mobile Limited or Ufone is a Pakistani GSM cellular service provider. It is the third mobile operator to enter Pakistani market. It started its operations under the brand Ufone, in Islamabad on January 29, 2001.

PTML is a wholly owned subsidiary of Pakistan Telecommunication Company Limited. Following PTCL's privatization, Ufone became a part of the Etisalat in 2006.

Ufone is the smallest mobile service provider in Pakistan with a subscriber base of 23 million. It has a market share of 12%, the least among all four mobile operators.

Ufone had appointed Rashid Khan as its CEO who had been the CEO of Jazz from 2008 to 2014. He was appointed as acting CEO again in August 2017. Rashid Khan died on 17 December 2020.

Radio Frequency Summary 

Ufone had bid on a 5 MHz block of 2100 MHz spectrum in the NGMS auction held in early 2014, however due to rising demand and lack of bandwidth to keep up, in December 2016, Ufone decided to re-farm a portion of its 900 MHz 2G network to 3G (HSPA+), and is now offering 3G over two frequencies to deal with the increasing load on the network. Ufone has only re-farmed their 900 MHz spectrum in Karachi, Lahore, Rawalpindi/Islamabad, Abbottabad, Sheikhupura and Sialkot.

PTML Ufone won 2x9 MHz of 1800 MHz in the 2021 NGMS auction held by PTA, bringing its total spectrum in the band up to 15 MHz which will be used for improvement of its existing 4G services.

4G launch 
On 9 February 2019, Ufone launched its 4G network in the twin cities of Islamabad and Rawalpindi. It has done so using existing NGMS licenses. Ufone initially expanded its 4G coverage to Lahore, Karachi, Faisalabad, Sialkot, Peshawar, Quetta, Attock, Hyderabad, Mirpurkhas, Digri, Jhuddo, Naukot, Mithi, Pabbi, Multan and Nowshehra  and now serving with 4G services across pakistan more than 100 cities .

Awards

Ufone has won Best Telecommunication Service Provider Award at 2012 PAS Awards by Pakistan Advertisers Society.

See also 
 Communications in Pakistan
 Uth Records
 List of mobile phone companies in Pakistan
 UPaisa

References 

Mobile phone companies of Pakistan
Companies based in Islamabad
Telecommunications companies established in 2001
2001 establishments in Pakistan
Pakistani brands
PTCL
Internet service providers of Pakistan